Linognathus is a genus of lice belonging to the family Linognathidae.

The species of this genus are found in Eurasia, Africa and Northern America.

Species:
 Linognathus aepycerus Bedford, 1936 
 Linognathus africanus Kellogg & Paine, 1911

References

Troctomorpha